Robert E. Dvorsky (born August 18, 1948) is a former Iowa State Senator from the 37th District (previously numbered the 15th District and 25th District).  A Democrat, he received his BS and MPA from the University of Iowa and is a retired executive officer for the 6th Judicial District, Department of Correctional Services.

Early life and education

Senator Dvorksy was born in Burlington, Iowa in 1948. Dvorsky went to high school at University High School in Iowa City, and upon graduation enrolled at the University of Iowa receiving his Bachelor of Science and later his Master of Public Administration.

Iowa Legislature

Dvorsky currently serves on several committees in the Iowa Senate - the Education committee; the Rebuild Iowa committee; the Rules and Administration committee; and the Appropriations committee, where he is chair. His prior political experience includes serving as a representative in the Iowa House from 1987 to 1995, serving as the Mason City Superintendent of Recreation from 1973 to 1979, and serving on the Coralville City Council from 1979 to 1986.

Dvorsky was re-elected in 2006 with 19,027 votes, running unopposed.

Dvorsky announced his retirement in 2018 and was succeeded by activist Zach Wahls, a fellow Democrat.

References

External links
Senator Robert Dvorsky official Iowa Legislature site
Senator Robert Dvorsky official Iowa General Assembly site
State Senator Robert Dvorsky official constituency site
 

1948 births
Living people
Democratic Party Iowa state senators
University of Iowa alumni
People from Mason City, Iowa
People from Johnson County, Iowa
Iowa city council members
Politicians from Burlington, Iowa
Democratic Party members of the Iowa House of Representatives
21st-century American politicians